This is a list of mayors of Utrecht since the end of the Napoleonic occupation in 1813.

J. van der Velden 1813–1815
R. A. Schutt 1815–1824
W. R. Baron van Heeckeren van Brandsenburg 1816–1824
J. F. Gobius 1818–1821
J. Borski 1821–1824
J. van Doelen 1824–1827
H.M.A.J. van Asch van Wijck 1827–1839
N. P. J. Kien 1839–1878
W. R. Boer 1878–1891
B. Reiger 1891–1908
A. F. baron van Lynden 1908–1914
J. P. Fockema Andreae 1914–1933
G. A. W. ter Pelkwijk 1934–1942 and 1945–1948
C. van Ravenswaay 1942–1945
Jhr. C. A. de Ranitz 1948–1970
H. G. I. Baron Van Tuyll van Serooskerken 1970–1974
H. J. L. Vonhoff 1974–1980
M. W. Vos-van Gortel 1980–1992
I. W. Opstelten 1992–1999
A. H. Brouwer-Korf 1999–2007
A. Wolfsen 2008–2014
J.H.C. van Zanen 2014–2020
Peter den Oudsten 2020
Sharon Dijksma since 2020

See also
 Timeline of Utrecht

External links 
 List of mayors of Utrecht 1402–present

History of Utrecht (city)
Utrecht